Rowley Island is one of the Canadian Arctic islands in the Qikiqtaaluk Region, Nunavut.

It is named after the arctic explorer Graham Westbrook Rowley.

References

External links
 FOX-1 historical information
 Past 24 hours weather

Islands of Foxe Basin
Uninhabited islands of Qikiqtaaluk Region
Former populated places in the Qikiqtaaluk Region